Anillus is a genus of ground beetles in the family Carabidae. There are about 19 described species in Anillus.

Species
These 19 species belong to the genus Anillus:

 Anillus angelae Magrini & Vanni, 1989
 Anillus bordonii Magrini & Vanni, 1993
 Anillus caecus Jacquelin du Val, 1851
 Anillus cebennicus Balazuc & Bruneau de Miré, 1964
 Anillus cirocchii Magrini & Vanni, 1989
 Anillus convexus Saulcy, 1864
 Anillus corsicus Perris, 1869
 Anillus florentinus Dieck, 1869
 Anillus frater Aubé, 1863
 Anillus hypogaeus Aubé, 1861
 Anillus joffrei Sainte-Claire Deville, 1925
 Anillus latialis Jeannel, 1937
 Anillus marii Magrini & Vanni, 1989
 Anillus minervae Coiffait, 1956
 Anillus pacei Magrini & Vanni, 1993
 Anillus petriolii Magrini, 2014
 Anillus sekerai Reitter, 1906
 Anillus sulcatellus Coiffait, 1958
 Anillus virginiae Magrini & Vanni, 1993

References

Trechinae